Cuidado con las imitaciones is a 1948 Argentine film directed by Luis Bayón Herrera.

Cast
 Rafael Carret
 Jorge Luz
 Zelmar Gueñol
 Guillermo Rico
 Juan Carlos Cambón
 Tito Martínez del Box
 Silvia Randall
 Francisco Pablo Donadío
 Ermete Meliante
 Julio Vial
 Marino Seré
 Arístides Soler
 Ana María Roig
 Blanquita Amaro
 Tato Cifuentes

References

External links
 

1948 films
1940s Spanish-language films
Argentine black-and-white films
Films directed by Luis Bayón Herrera
1940s Argentine films